Joel Fletcher Allan, better known as Joel Fletcher, is a music producer and DJ from Melbourne, Australia, who is best known for his 2013 remix of New Zealand rapper Savage's 2005 single "Swing", which charted in Australia and in New Zealand. In 2014, Fletcher was a support act for Avicii's headline tour for the Melbourne and Brisbane dates. At the APRA Music Awards of 2015, Fletcher won Dance Work of the Year for "Swing (Joel Fletcher Remix)", which was co-written by Fletcher, Demetrius Savelio (aka Savage), Nathan Holmes and Aaron Ngawhika.

In 2014, Fletcher embarked on a four-month tour of North America, called the Bounce Bus Tour, alongside Timmy Trumpet and Will Sparks.

Discography

Singles

Awards and nominations

APRA Awards
The APRA Awards are presented annually from 1982 by the Australasian Performing Right Association (APRA), "honouring composers and songwriters".

! 
|-
| 2014 
| "Bring it Back" (Will Sparks & Joel Fletcher)
| Dance Work of the Year
| 
| 
|-
| 2015 || "Swing (Joel Fletcher Remix)" || Dance Work of the Year ||  || 
|-
| 2015 || "Swing (Joel Fletcher Remix)" || Most Australian Played Work of the Year ||  || 
|-

References

Living people
APRA Award winners
DJs from Melbourne
1992 births
Electronic dance music DJs